This article is a list of diseases of cyclamens (Cyclamen persicum).

Bacterial diseases

Fungal diseases

Nematodes, parasitic

Virus and viroid diseases

Phytoplasmal diseases

References

 Common Names of Diseases, The American Phytopathological Society

Cyclamen
Ornamental plant pathogens and diseases